People's Revolutionary Party (Spanish: Partido Revolucionario del Pueblo) is a small political party in Chile. The group has its origins in the Revolutionary Left Movement (Movimiento de Izquierda Revolucionaria or MIR).

See also
 List of political parties in Chile

References 

Defunct political parties in Chile